Anna Jane Lanning (born 25 March 1994) is an Australian cricketer who plays as a right-handed batter and occasional right-arm medium pace bowler. She has played for Warwickshire, the ACT Meteors, the Melbourne Renegades, Victoria and the Melbourne Stars. She plays club cricket for Box Hill.

Lanning is the younger sister of Australian cricket captain Meg Lanning.

Lanning scored 73 in a player of the match performance on debut for the Renegades in the 2019–20 WBBL season.

References

External links

Anna Lanning at Cricket Australia

1994 births
Living people
Sportswomen from New South Wales
Cricketers from New South Wales
Australian women cricketers
ACT Meteors cricketers
Melbourne Renegades (WBBL) cricketers
Melbourne Stars (WBBL) cricketers
Victoria women cricketers
Warwickshire women cricketers